Six Characters in Search of an Author is an opera in three acts by composer Hugo Weisgall. The work uses an English libretto by Denis Johnston that is based on the play of the same name by Luigi Pirandello. The opera was commissioned by the New York City Opera under the leadership Julius Rudel. It premiered at New York City Center on April 26, 1959 in a production staged by William Ball and using sets and costumes designed by Gary Smith.

The work was mounted in 1990 by the Lyric Opera of Chicago's Lyric Opera Center for American Artists in 1990, a production which was recorded and released on the New World Records label. The production was conducted by Lee Schaenen and starred Kevin Anderson as The Director, Bruce Fowler as The Tennore Buffo, Andrew Schroeder as The Accompanist, Michael Wadsworth as The Basso Cantante, Philip Zawisza as The Stage Manager, Elizabeth Futral as The Coloratura, Susan Foster as The Prompter,  Joslyn King as The Mezzo, Dianne Pritchett as The Wardrobe Mistress, Paula LoVerne as Madame Pace, Robert Orth as The Father, Gary Lehman as The Son, Elizabeth Byrne as The Stepdaughter, and  Nancy Maultsby as The Mother.

Another professional production was mounted in 2000 at the McCarter Theater in Princeton, New Jersey for the Opera Festival of New Jersey.

Oberlin College, the Manhattan School of Music, and the University of Illinois at Urbana-Champaign mounted student productions in 
1974, 1995, and 2002 respectively.

Roles

References

English-language operas
Operas
1959 operas
Operas by Hugo Weisgall
Opera world premieres at New York City Opera
Operas based on plays
Adaptations of works by Luigi Pirandello
Works set in theatres